Black Oxygen is an alternative rock/pop band formed in Kansas City and currently based in Los Angeles. The band is composed of brothers David and Nick Lyle. David is vocalist and lead guitarist, while Nick plays drums and keyboards. They have released three studio albums and one EP.

History
Black Oxygen was formed in Kansas City by David Lyle (vocals, guitar) and his brother Nick (drums, keyboards).
In 2010, they caught the attention of music industry specialists in Atlanta after winning 1st place in Battle of the Bands/Club Wars in the midwest and David winning Banzai's Outstanding Guitarist. Shortly afterwards, David was invited to Los Angeles in order to learn about the recording process. In the fall of 2011, the band performed the national anthem at Arrowhead Stadium in Kansas City, opening an NFL football game between rival teams Kansas City Chiefs and Oakland Raiders. During that same year, Black Oxygen were also spotted by rapper Kutt Calhoun, and together they released the track "Pressure".

In 2012, Black Oxygen released their debut album, The American Dream. The first two singles, "Take It to the Limit" and "The American Dream" reached #59 and #48 respectively on rock radio charts. "Take It to the Limit" was also used by ESPN during broadcast and "The American Dream" made it to #12 on the Billboard Hot Single Sales chart.

2014 saw the release of the band's sophomore album, Beating Time, on their own independent label, Dreamstreet Records. The lead single, "Livin' the Life", went on to reach #14 on rock radio charts. The track was used by Sporting Kansas City, as well as by the NFL Network in 2017 during the Kansas City Chiefs vs. Pittsburgh Steelers Divisional Playoff game. That same year, Black Oxygen collaborated with rapper Irv Da Phenom in the release of the song "Madman", which premiered on HipHopDX.

In 2016, Black Oxygen released a single and music video for "Whole Thang", a song featuring rappers Kstylis and Kutt Calhoun.
In 2017, the band released three singles: "A Step Away", "Speeding Bullet", which was dedicated to Paul Walker, and "On That Vibe", featuring Navé Monjo. They followed this with over one month of shows on their Make America Rock Again 2017 USA Tour, during which they played their first arena performance.

Black Oxygen released the EP City of Angels in 2018, which included the track "Rockstar", a Post Malone cover.

In 2019, the band released the single "Drop It", featuring Tech N9ne. They also issued their third studio album, titled The Times of Our Lives. The single "Everything" went to #1 on the Rock Radio Chart in the US and also to the top of the Billboard Mainstream Rock Chart. A special deluxe edition of the album was also released, containing 27 tracks.
The brothers worked with Shifty Shellshock of Crazy Town on the single "Burning Into the Night", and did a US-Canadian tour together.

Discography
Studio albums
 The American Dream (2012)
 Beating Time (2014)
 The Times of Our Lives (2019)

EPs
 City of Angels (2018)

Singles
 "Pressure" (feat. Kutt Calhoun) (2011)
 "The American Dream" (2012)
 "Take It to the Limit" (2012)
 "Livin' the Life" (2014)
 "Madman" (feat. Irv Da Phenom) (2014)
 "Whole Thang" (feat. Kstylis & Kutt Calhoun) (2016)
 "A Step Away" (feat. Chantel Zales) (2017)
 "Speeding Bullet" (2017)
 "On That Vibe" (feat. Navé Monjo) (2017)
 "Rockstar" (2018)
 "Drop It" (feat. Tech N9ne) (2019)
 "Everything" (2019)
 "Burning Into the Night" (feat. Shifty Shellshock) (2019)
 "Laceyville" (2022)
 "Darkside" (feat. Joey Cool) (2022)

References

External links
 Official website

Alternative rock groups from California